Humanities, arts, and social sciences (HASS) is a broad term used to group together the academic disciplines of humanities, arts and social sciences. It is used as an academic counterpart to science, technology, engineering, and mathematics in the United States, Canada, Australia, and other countries. HASS graduates comprise the majority of the workforce in many developed countries (e.g. 64% in Australia). However, HUMSS Courses often receive a lower governmental funding and can have lower reputation within universities. There is a measured relationship between citizens' HASS awareness with more accurate threat perceptions, high community activity, and cultural engagement at the local level. In recent years, a return to a holistic reintegration of HASS and STEM disciplines has been promoted in the U.S. by the National Academies of Sciences, Engineering, and Mathematics (NASEM).

In the Philippines, a similar term called Humanities and Social Sciences is used to describe a Senior High Strand that involves the Liberal Arts. This strand was set up in place as part of the K-12 program that was implemented in the country.

In 2020 an initiative for the UK rebranded the HASS acronym for humanities, the arts and social sciences as SHAPE, Social Sciences, Humanities and the Arts for People and the Economy, to promote and highlight the importance of these subjects in education, society and the economy.

References 

Education by subject
Education policy
Experiential learning
Learning programs
Humanities education
The arts
Social sciences